Naam Iruvar Namakku Iruvar is a 1998 Indian Tamil-language directed by Sundar C. Prabhu Deva and Meena played the leading roles, whilst the film featured an extensive cast, along with a bevvy of supporting actors. The film released on 14 January 1998. The film was loosely based on the 1995 Hollywood movie Two Much. The film has been dubbed into Hindi as Biwi No. 2 (2007).

Plot 
To steal an expensive diamond, a swindler pretends to be in love with a wealthy businessman's daughter. Later, the swindler meets Pooja's sister and gets attracted to her.

Cast

Production
During a stage of production, Prabhudeva, Maheshwari and the entire crew including Sundar C had landed in South Africa. Rambha had not boarded the plane with them as planned. The unit became nervous, not knowing what to do, as the shooting the time and spot that they had reserved in Sun City was getting wasted. After waiting for a long time, they went ahead and had Maheshwari put on Rambha's costumes and picturized the song with her and Prabhudeva. Rambha, who arrived two days later, got wild and furious that Sundar and company would picture the song without her. She went back to Chennai almost three days before the Naam Iruvar Namakku Iruvar unit and got ready to shoot for Kaathala Kaathala instead.

Sundar and others who were angry and disappointed with Rambha's behaviour filed complaints with film organizations. Meanwhile, more developments came about once Rambha left the film. It appeared that the director's wife, Khushbu had strongly thrown in a recommendation for Simran to grab the role that Rambha had trashed, but Meena entered the picture from somewhere, all of a sudden. The fact was that Meena gave up her Kaathala Kaathala role for Rambha and Soundarya, while Rambha gave up her Na. Ir. Na. Ir role for Meena. On a side note to the entire matter, Simran announced that she gave up her chances to star in both Kaathala Kaathala and Naam Iruvar Namakku Iruvar, because she did not want to pack herself with call sheet troubles and not be able to act in that she had already committed to.

Soundtrack
The soundtrack album consists of 6 songs composed by Karthik Raja and lyrics written by Palani Bharathi.

Release
The film had a strong opening at the box office in January 1998.

References

External links

1998 films
Films shot in Ooty
Films shot in South Africa
1990s Tamil-language films
Films directed by Sundar C.
Indian romantic comedy films
1998 romantic comedy films
Indian remakes of French films
Films scored by Karthik Raja